Ryan Stewart is a Canadian record producer, songwriter, multi-instrumentalist and studio owner based out of Vancouver, British Columbia. He has worked with such artists Carly Rae Jepsen, Hedley, Simple Plan, Victoria Duffield, Tyler Shaw, Andrew Allen, Bif Naked, Cassie Dasilva, Matt Webb (Marianas Trench), FAANGS, Carmen & Camille and Laurell, among many others.

Notable works

References

External links
https://web.archive.org/web/20100415201840/http://www.cmw.net/cmw2010/awards_crma.asp
http://network.nationalpost.com/NP/blogs/theampersand/archive/2010/03/03/michael-bubl-233-drake-justin-bieber-and-premier-rock-legends-as-junos-announce-2010-nominees-performers.aspx
http://www.bclocalnews.com/entertainment/87264307.html
http://spotlight.rogers.com/entertainment/tv/10026/junos-interview-ryan-stewart

Canadian songwriters
Living people
Year of birth missing (living people)